Coelotrochus davegibbsi is a species of sea snail, a marine gastropod mollusk in the family Trochidae, the top snails.

Description
The width of the shell attains 6.5 mm.

Distribution
This marine species is endemic to New Zealand and occurs off Three Kings Islands.

References

 Marshall B.A. 1998. A review of the Recent Trochini of New Zealand (Mollusca: Gastropoda: Trochidae). Molluscan Research 19(1): 73-106
 Spencer, H.G.; Marshall, B.A.; Maxwell, P.A.; Grant-Mackie, J.A.; Stilwell, J.D.; Willan, R.C.; Campbell, H.J.; Crampton, J.S.; Henderson, R.A.; Bradshaw, M.A.; Waterhouse, J.B.; Pojeta, J. Jr (2009). Phylum Mollusca: chitons, clams, tusk shells, snails, squids, and kin, in: Gordon, D.P. (Ed.) (2009). New Zealand inventory of biodiversity: 1. Kingdom Animalia: Radiata, Lophotrochozoa, Deuterostomia. pp. 161–254

davegibbsi
Gastropods described in 1998